Simon Franklin is Professor of Slavonic Studies at the University of Cambridge, UK.  He is a Fellow of Clare College.

In 2007 he was awarded the Lomonosov Gold Medal by the Russian Academy of Sciences for outstanding achievements in research in Russian history and culture.

Selected bibliography
 Sermons and Rhetoric of Kievan Rus (Harvard University Press, 1991)
 (with Jonathan Shepard) The Emergence of Rus, 750-1200 (Longman, 1996)
 Byzantium - Rus - Russia: Studies in the Translation of Christian Culture Ashgate, 2002
 National Identity in Russian Culture. An Introduction (ed. with Emma Widdis) Cambridge University Press, 2004
 Writing, Society and Culture in Early Rus, c. 950-1300 (Cambridge University Press, 2002)
 Information and Empire. Mechanisms of Communication in Russia, 1600-1850 (ed. with Katherine Bowers) (Open Book Publishers, 2017)
 The Russian Graphosphere 1450-1850 (Cambridge University Press, 2019)

References

Living people
Fellows of Clare College, Cambridge
Academics of the University of Cambridge
British historians
Recipients of the Lomonosov Gold Medal
Year of birth missing (living people)